Bangladesh Food Safety Authority is an autonomous national food safety regulatory agency which works as a statutory organization and is located in Dhaka, Bangladesh. Mustak Hassan Md Iftekhar is the chairman of the authority.

History
The authority was formed in February 2015, under the Food Safety Act 2013. The authority works under the Ministry of Food. The authority was modeled on the American Food and Drug Administration. It is governed by a five-member decision making body. The agency has its own mobile court that can fine and sentence people for food adulteration.

References

Government agencies of Bangladesh
2015 establishments in Bangladesh
Food and drink in Bangladesh
Organisations based in Dhaka
Food safety organizations
Regulators of Bangladesh